Private Eyes is a 1953 comedy film starring The Bowery Boys. The film was released on December 6, 1953, by Allied Artists and is the thirty-second film in the series.

Plot
Sach is punched in the nose by Herbie, a local kid who the boys know, and acquires the ability to read people's minds. Slip sees this as an opportunity to buy a detective agency, and their first client is a beautiful blonde who is trying to escape from her connections with mobsters. She leaves behind a stolen mink coat and an envelope that would incriminate the mobsters. The mobsters, trying to get the envelope back, kidnap Herbie in the hopes to persuade the boys to return the envelope. Slip and Sach, after being tipped off where Herbie is being held, go there in disguise. They foil the mobsters plans and rescue Herbie.

Cast

The Bowery Boys
Leo Gorcey as Terrance Aloysius "Slip" Mahoney
Huntz Hall as Horace Debussy "Sach" Jones
David Gorcey as Chuck Anderson (Credited as David Condon)
Bennie Bartlett as Butch Williams

Remaining cast
Bernard Gorcey as Louie Dumbrowski
Rudy Lee as Herbie
Joyce Holden as Myra
Robert Osterloh as Professor Damon
Chick Chandler as Eddie the Detective
Emil Sitka as the patient in the wheelchair
Tim Ryan as Andy the Cop

Production
The film was made under the working title of Bowery Bloodhounds.

Home media
Warner Archives released the film on made-to-order DVD in the United States as part of "The Bowery Boys, Volume Two" on April 9, 2013.

References

External links

1953 comedy films
1953 films
American black-and-white films
American comedy films
Bowery Boys films
Allied Artists films
1950s English-language films
Films directed by Edward Bernds
1950s American films